Novoukrainka is a rural locality (a village) in Tanalyksky Selsoviet, Khaybullinsky District, Bashkortostan, Russia. The population was 233 as of 2010. There are 2 streets.

Geography 
Novoukrainka is located 38 km northeast of Akyar (the district's administrative centre) by road. Savelyevka is the nearest rural locality.

References 

Rural localities in Khaybullinsky District